In mathematics, the Bernstein–Sato polynomial is a polynomial related to differential operators,  introduced independently by  and , . It is also known as the b-function,  the b-polynomial, and the Bernstein polynomial, though it is not related to the Bernstein polynomials used in approximation theory. It has applications to singularity theory, monodromy theory, and quantum field theory.

 gives an elementary introduction, while  and  give more advanced accounts.

Definition and properties

If  is a polynomial in several variables, then there is a non-zero polynomial  and a differential operator  with polynomial coefficients such that

The Bernstein–Sato polynomial is the monic polynomial of smallest degree amongst such polynomials .  Its existence can be shown using the notion of holonomic D-modules.

 proved that all roots of the Bernstein–Sato polynomial are negative rational numbers.

The Bernstein–Sato polynomial can also be defined for products of  powers of several polynomials . In this case it is a product of linear factors with rational coefficients.

 generalized the Bernstein–Sato polynomial to arbitrary varieties.

Note, that the Bernstein–Sato polynomial can be computed algorithmically. However, such computations are hard in general. There are implementations of related algorithms in computer algebra systems RISA/Asir, Macaulay2, and SINGULAR.

 presented algorithms to compute the Bernstein–Sato polynomial of an affine variety together with an implementation in the computer algebra system SINGULAR.

 described some of the algorithms for computing Bernstein–Sato polynomials by computer.

Examples 
 If  then

so the Bernstein–Sato polynomial is

 If  then

so

 The Bernstein–Sato polynomial of x2 + y3 is

If tij are n2 variables, then the Bernstein–Sato polynomial of det(tij) is given by

which follows from

where Ω is Cayley's omega process, which in turn follows from the Capelli identity.

Applications 
 If  is a non-negative polynomial then , initially defined for s with non-negative real part, can be analytically continued to a meromorphic distribution-valued function of s by repeatedly using the functional equation

It may have poles whenever b(s + n) is zero for a non-negative integer n.

 If f(x) is a  polynomial, not identically zero, then it has an inverse g that is a distribution; in other words, f g = 1 as distributions. If f(x) is non-negative the inverse can be constructed using the Bernstein–Sato polynomial by taking the constant term of the Laurent expansion of f(x)s at s = −1. For arbitrary f(x) just take  times the inverse of 

 The Malgrange–Ehrenpreis theorem states that every differential operator with constant coefficients has a Green's function. By taking Fourier transforms this follows from the fact that every polynomial has a distributional inverse, which is proved in the paragraph above.

 showed how to use the Bernstein polynomial to define dimensional regularization rigorously, in the massive Euclidean case.

 The Bernstein-Sato functional equation is used in computations of some of the more complex kinds of singular integrals occurring in quantum field theory . Such computations are needed for precision measurements in elementary particle physics as practiced for instance at CERN (see the papers citing ). However, the most interesting cases require a simple generalization of the Bernstein-Sato functional equation to the product of two polynomials , with x having 2-6 scalar components, and the pair of polynomials having orders 2 and 3. Devising ways to bypass the combinatorial explosion of the brute force algorithm would be of great value in such applications.

Notes

References 

 (Princeton, NJ, 1996/1997) 

Polynomials
Differential operators